Greene Flake "Red" Laird (December 16, 1902 – April 10, 1992) was an American college basketball and baseball coach. He is best known for being Virginia Tech's head baseball coach for 30 seasons and compiling the second most wins in program history through the 2013 season (343). He was inducted into the American Baseball Coaches Association Hall of Fame in 1971,  and into the Virginia Tech Sports Hall of Fame in 1983. The home dugout at Virginia Tech's home baseball venue, English Field, is named in his honor. Laird also coached the men's basketball and baseball teams at Virginia Tech, Catawba College, and Davidson College as well as the freshman football team at Davidson. Laird attended Davidson between 1922–23 and 1925–26. While there he earned 12 varsity letters – four each in football, basketball and baseball.

Head coaching record

Basketball

Baseball

References

External links
 

1902 births
1992 deaths
American men's basketball players
Baseball coaches from North Carolina
Basketball coaches from North Carolina
Baseball players from North Carolina
Basketball players from North Carolina
Catawba Indians baseball coaches
Catawba Indians men's basketball coaches
Davidson Wildcats baseball coaches
Davidson Wildcats baseball players
Davidson Wildcats football players
Davidson Wildcats men's basketball coaches
Davidson Wildcats men's basketball players
Players of American football from North Carolina
Virginia Tech Hokies baseball coaches
Virginia Tech Hokies men's basketball coaches